Suma River is a river of Mbeya Region, Tanzania. It originates on the southern slopes of Mount Rungwe and is a tributary of the Mbaka River.

References

Rivers of Tanzania
Geography of Mbeya Region